McGoldrick is a surname of Irish origin. Notable people with the surname include:

Barry McGoldrick (born 1985), Irish Gaelic footballer
David McGoldrick (born 1987), English footballer
Eddie McGoldrick (born 1965), English-born Irish footballer and manager
Grainne McGoldrick, Northern Irish camogie player
Jake McGoldrick, American council member
Joseph McGoldrick (1901–1978), American NYC Comptroller and NY State Residential Rent Control Commissioner, lawyer, and professor
Kevin McGoldrick (born 1972), Scottish footballer
Michael McGoldrick (born 1965), Northern Irish murder victim
Michael McGoldrick (born 1971), English musician
Patrick McGoldrick (1865–1939), Irish politician
Ryan McGoldrick (born 1981), Australian rugby league player
Sean Leo McGoldrick, Irish Gaelic footballer
Sean McGoldrick (born 1991), Welsh boxer
Tom McGoldrick (born 1929), English footballer

See also
Goldrick

Footnotes